Aleksandra Zabrocka (born 27 June 1984) is a cyclo cross rider and road cyclist from Poland. She represented her nation at the 2004 UCI Road World Championships.

References

External links
 profile at Procyclingstats.com

1984 births
Polish female cyclists
Living people
Place of birth missing (living people)